Gaelic games in North America or North America GAA is an unofficial provincial council for the Gaelic Athletic Association and Gaelic games in North America. The board is also responsible for the Gaelic Athletic Association sports of hurling, Gaelic football, camogie, rounders and handball in North America. They do not have a high profile in North America, but are developing sports.

The Gaelic games in North America are governed by three Gaelic Athletic Association (GAA) County boards: In Canada, Gaelic games are governed by Gaelic Games Canada, while in the USA they are governed by the United States GAA and the New York GAA. Many tournaments include cultural events.

County boards
 

Canada
New York
United States

All-Ireland Football Championship
New York — along with London — fields a representative team in the Connacht Senior Football Championship, the qualification for the All-Ireland Senior Football Championship. New York plays its home games at the 2,000 seat Gaelic Park, a stadium in Riverdale in the Bronx, New York owned by Manhattan College. The New York team has not been successful, and has yet to reach the Connacht semifinals.

History
The New York Board is the oldest county board of the GAA in North America; however, Gaelic games were played in many parts of the continent before the foundation of the GAA, and the organisation of county boards. Hurling was recorded as being played in the Colony of Newfoundland in 1788. The New York GAA has a long history in Gaelic games starting at a time of the mass immigration to New York from Ireland. The first organized hurling and football club in New York was founded in 1857.

The Toronto Divisional board of the GAA was formed in 1947.

See also
 Gaelic Athletic Association

References

Irish-American culture in sports
Nor
Nor